The International Holocaust Remembrance Alliance (IHRA) (until January 2013 known as the Task Force for International Cooperation on Holocaust Education, Remembrance, and Research or ITF) is an intergovernmental organization founded in 1998 which unites governments and experts to strengthen, advance and promote Holocaust education, research and remembrance worldwide and to uphold the commitments of the Declaration of the Stockholm International Forum on the Holocaust. The IHRA has 34 member countries, one liaison country and seven observer countries.

The organization was founded by the then sitting Swedish Prime Minister Göran Persson in 1998. From 26–28 January 2000, the Stockholm International Forum on the Holocaust was held, bringing together high-ranking political leaders and officials from more than forty countries to meet with civic and religious leaders, survivors, educators, and historians. Nobel Prize laureate Elie Wiesel served as the Forum's honorary Chairman and Professor Yehuda Bauer was the senior Academic Advisor to the forum.

The IHRA carries out internal projects, seeks to influence public-policy making on Holocaust-related issues and develops research focusing on lesser known aspects of the Holocaust. The IHRA adopted the Working Definition of Antisemitism in 2016 and has since promoted it.

Background 
Following a survey in 1997 which revealed that many school children lacked knowledge about the Holocaust, and also affected by his personal experience of visiting the site of the former Neuengamme concentration camp near Hamburg, Swedish Prime Minister Göran Persson decided to launch a debate in parliament about Holocaust education in Sweden. This resulted in the Swedish information campaign entitled Levande Historia (Living History). Realizing that 'the fight against ignorance about the Holocaust called for an international partnership' Persson also approached US President Bill Clinton and UK Prime Minister Tony Blair for their support in establishing an international organization to support Holocaust education, remembrance, and research worldwide.

History
The IHRA was founded in 1998 by Persson as the Task Force for International Cooperation on Holocaust Education, Remembrance, and Research (ITF). Its first meeting took place in May 1998. Holocaust scholar Yehuda Bauer took on the role of academic advisor. In 1998, Germany and Israel joined the initiative, followed in 1999 by the Netherlands, Poland, France, and Italy.

In 2013, ITF changed its name to the International Holocaust Remembrance Alliance (IHRA). The logo of the IHRA, also adopted in 2013, was designed by the renowned architect, Daniel Libeskind.

The Stockholm International Forum on the Holocaust
During 26–28 January 2000, the Stockholm International Forum on the Holocaust was held to mark the 55th anniversary of the liberation of Auschwitz on 27 January 1945. It was attended by historians, politicians, and heads of state from 45 countries. Yehuda Bauer was invited to head the academic committee, while Nobel Prize Laureate Professor Elie Wiesel was asked to become the Honorary Chairman of the Forum. A joint declaration, the Stockholm Declaration, was unanimously adopted. As German sociologist Helmut Dubiel notes, the conference "took place in an atmosphere informed by right-wing violence and spectacular success of rightist parties at the voting polls. Nonetheless, the end of the millennium and the anniversary of Auschwitz constituted a reference point for the foundation of a transnational union for struggle against genocide."

Following the initial Forum on the Holocaust, the Stockholm International Forum Conferences were convened a further three times on the topics of Combatting Intolerance 2001; Truth Justice and Reconciliation 2002; Preventing Genocide 2004.

The Declaration of the Stockholm International Forum on the Holocaust 
The declaration (not to be confused with the 1972 Stockholm Declaration adopted by the UN) is the founding document of the IHRA. It consists of eight paragraphs, which emphasize the importance of education, remembrance and research about the Holocaust.

The declaration advocates the need to uphold the "terrible truth of the Holocaust against those who deny it," and to preserve the memory of the Holocaust as a "touchstone in our understanding of the human capacity for good and evil." According to the declaration, "the international community shares a solemn responsibility to fight" "genocide, ethnic cleansing, racism, antisemitism and xenophobia".

Member countries 

The government of any UN member country may apply for IHRA membership. Subject to approval by the Plenary, the applicant will initially be accepted as an Observer country, and may participate as such in the Working Groups and the Plenary. The candidate country should establish a Holocaust Memorial Day (on January 27, or another date chosen by the applicant country). The government should also demonstrate a clear public policy commitment to Holocaust education at a senior political level, and must satisfy the IHRA that its archives dealing with the Holocaust period (1933-1950) are open for research and that there is or will be academic, educational, and public examination of the country's historical past during the Holocaust period.

Observer and liaison countries 
Countries that apply for membership of IHRA are initially accepted as Observers, subject to approval by the Plenary, and participate as such in the Working Groups and the Plenary.

On 24 June 2022, New Zealand joined IHRA as an observer. While the announcement was welcomed by the New Zealand Jewish Council and the Holocaust Centre of New Zealand as a means of combating racism and anti-Semitism, Palestine Solidarity Network Aotearoa chairman John Minto claimed that adopting the IHRA definition would silence criticism of alleged Israeli human rights abuses against the Palestinians.

Publications 
The IHRA has published a series of Holocaust-related books with the Metropol Verlag in Berlin. Current volumes in the IHRA Publication Series are

 Research in Teaching and Learning about the Holocaust: A Dialogue Beyond Borders (March 2017). A study of empirical research on teaching and learning about the Holocaust in fifteen languages. The multilingual focus of the project enables cross-cultural analyses and the transfer of knowledge between various regions and countries.

 Bystanders, Rescuers or Perpetrators? The Neutral Countries and the Shoah (March 2016). The volume offers a trans-national, comparative perspective on the varied reactions of the neutral countries to the Nazi persecution and murder of the European Jews. It examines the often ambivalent policies of these states towards Jewish refugees as well as towards their own Jewish nationals living in German-occupied countries. By breaking down persistent myths, this volume contributes to a more nuanced understanding of an under-researched chapter of Holocaust history and also considers the challenges and opportunities related to Holocaust education and remembrance in the neutral countries.

 Killing Sites – Research and Remembrance (March 2015). More than 2,000,000 Jews were killed by shooting during the Holocaust at several thousand mass killing sites across Europe. The volume aims to raise awareness of this centrally important aspect of the Holocaust by bringing together organizations and individuals dealing with the subject. This publication is the first relatively comprehensive and up-to-date anthology on the topic that reflects both the research and the fieldwork on the killing sites.

Organizational structure

Rotating chairmanship
The IHRA chairmanship rotates annually among member countries. The chair hosts the IHRA Plenary meetings up to twice a year in their country. Each country organizes and pays for the meetings taking place in the year of its chairmanship. The chair was held by Italy in 2018, Luxembourg in 2019, Germany in 2020 and Greece in 2021.

Permanent office
The IHRA Permanent Office (PO) was established on 11 March 2008 in Berlin, Germany. The Executive Secretary of the IHRA is Kathrin Meyer who runs the PO. The PO was created to ensure continuity between IHRA chairmanships and to manage the administrative activities of the IHRA. Primary responsibilities of the PO include providing assistance to the chairs, Working Groups, delegations, and other IHRA bodies, facilitating internal and external communication, and administrating the Grant Programme.

Delegations 
Each IHRA Member and Observer country forms a delegation, which is appointed by its government. The Head of Delegation (HoD) - for most countries a diplomat or other government official - coordinates the national delegation within the IHRA and represents their country at IHRA Plenary Sessions. The delegation may also consists of experts in the fields of Holocaust education, academia and museums and memorials, as well as general communication, who attend the relevant Working Groups (WGs).

Working groups
The IHRA has established a number of Working Groups, consisting of government representatives and other experts from each Member country who work together to share best practices and develop decisions to be put to the IHRA Plenary.

Academic Working Group (AWG)

The Academic Working Group (AWG) is concerned with promoting Holocaust research, increasing accessibility to, and organizing research into, archives, and encouraging international cooperation on research and scholarship. The AWG was instrumental in opening the International Tracing Service archives in Bad Arolson, which contains some 70 million pages of documents relating to the fate of over 17 million victims of World War II.

Education Working Group (EWG)

The Education Working Group (EWG) provides advice and expertise on matters of educational best practices, and works with member countries and project partners on educational development. The EWG has developed a wide range of teaching guidelines.

Memorials and Museums Working Group (MMWG)

The Memorials and Museums Working Group (MMWG) helps mobilize support and expertise for Holocaust memorials and related places of memory, it collects information on memorials and promotes communication and exchange between memorial sites and museums. The MMWG drafted an International Memorial and Museum Charter. The IHRA was also instrumental in campaigning against the destruction of the site of the former Gusen Concentration Camp in Austria, which will now be preserved as a memorial.

Communication Working Group (CWG)

The Communication Working Group (CWG) provides IHRA's target groups with information about the IHRA and its initiatives, ensures efficient communication among the members of the IHRA, and informs internal and external audiences on developments in Holocaust education, remembrance, and research.

Committees
The IHRA has three thematic committees that bring together experts from across the Working Groups to address topics that are of contemporary interest to the IHRA.

Committee on Antisemitism and Holocaust Denial
The Committee on Antisemitism and Holocaust Denial was created to address the upsurge in antisemitism and Holocaust denial and trivialization. Two of the Committee's key achievements are the "Working Definition of Holocaust Denial and Distortion" (adopted at the October Plenary Session 2013) and the "Working Definition of Antisemitism".

Working Definition of Antisemitism 

In 2016, IHRA adopted the Working Definition of Antisemitism, first published by the EUMC in 2005. IHRA adopted the Working Definition of Antisemitism at a plenary session in 2016. On 1 June 2017, the European Parliament voted to adopt a resolution calling on European Union member states and their institutions to adopt and apply the definition. The non-legally binding working definition includes illustrative examples of antisemitism to guide the IHRA in its work. These examples include classical antisemitic tropes, Holocaust denial and attempts to apply a double standard to the State of Israel. Numerous governmental and other organizations have adopted the IHRA definition. However, the working definition has been criticised by some as too broad, and conflating anti-Zionism with antisemitism.

Committee on the Genocide of the Roma
The Committee on the Genocide of the Roma aims to increase the commitment of the IHRA Member Countries to educate, research and remember the genocide of the Roma. Examples of key materials developed by the Committee include a Bibliography and Historiographical Review and an Overview of International Organizations working on historical and contemporary issues connected to the genocide of the Roma.

Committee on the Holocaust, Genocide, and Crimes Against Humanity
The Committee on the Holocaust, Genocide and Crimes Against Humanity was established to support educators who choose to relate the Holocaust to other genocides and crimes against humanity.  A central accomplishment of the Committee is the recently finalized survey, A Matter of Comparison: The Holocaust, Genocides and Crimes Against Humanity; An Analysis and Overview of Comparative Literature and Programs The Committee has also recently completed a working paper entitled "History Never Repeats itself, but Sometimes it Rhymes: comparing the Holocaust to different Atrocities". This working paper aims to explore what we mean by "compare" when we relate the Holocaust to other genocides and crimes against humanity.

Permanent International Partner Organizations 
Currently the organization has seven Permanent International Partner organizations, which hold the status of observers within the IHRA: United Nations, UNESCO, OSCE/ODIHR, International Tracing Service (ITS), European Union Agency for Fundamental Rights (FRA), Council of Europe, and the Claims Conference.

The IHRA formalized its relations with the Council of Europe and with the Organization for Security and Co-operation in Europe's Office for Democratic Institutions and Human Rights in 2010.

IHRA Multi-Year Work Plan
Multi-Year Work Plans (MYWP) were conceived to allow the IHRA to carry out specific projects for longer periods. There are currently four MYWPs:

 MYWP on Archival Access aims to support the open access to archives in IHRA Member Countries as mandated in the Stockholm Declaration. In 2015 the MYWP supported the IHRA Chair in securing a specific exception for Holocaust-related materials in the EU General Data Protection Regulation.

 MYWP on Education Research aims to provide an overview of knowledge derived from empirical research studies about teaching and learning about the Holocaust. The MYWP held a conference in February 2016 and published the book Research in Teaching and Learning about the Holocaust. A Dialogue Beyond Borders in March 2017.

 MYWP on Holocaust Memorial Days seeks to coordinate visits by IHRA representatives to participate in commemorative ceremonies in IHRA Member and Observer Countries. In 2015 a roundtable was held in Budapest and in 2017 visits were made to Skopje and Sofia.

 MYWP on Killing Sites is dedicated to the research, commemoration and preservation of places where mass shootings took place. In 2015 the MYWP published a book entitled Killing Sites – Research and Remembrance.

IHRA Grant Programme
The IHRA provides financial support to projects related to its mandate fields. The organization's current Grant Strategy includes two programs: 
 Develop strategies for Holocaust Memorial Days in a way that injects substance, real meaning, and educational value into these events. 
 Raise awareness and promote research into the causes of the Holocaust, its driving forces and mechanism, with a focus on preventing genocide, ethnic cleansing, racism, antisemitism, and xenophobia.

Controversies

The Norwegian chairmanship and Knut Hamsun 
The IHRA faced criticism from a number of public and academic Jewish groups and personalities in relation to the Norwegian chairmanship of 2009. The chairmanship coincided with a controversial decision by Norway to commemorate the 150th anniversary of the birth of Knut Hamsun, the Nobel Prize–winning Norwegian author and later Nazi sympathizer. Dr. Manfred Gerstenfeld, Chairman of the Jerusalem Center for Public Affairs, challenged Norway's chairmanship of the IHRA, arguing that "this country is unfit to hold such a position when in the same year it has held major memorial activities for the Nazi-admirer Hamsun."

On 20 July 2009, the Norwegian IHRA Chair published a statement rejecting the accusations against it, and promising to continue the IHRA's efforts to combat antisemitism and promote Holocaust education.

In an article for Israeli newspaper The Jerusalem Post, Yehuda Bauer defended the Norwegian chairmanship. Bauer emphasized Norway's commitment to Holocaust education, while also acknowledging the continuing presence of antisemitism in Norway and elsewhere:

The arguments against Norway would be more credible if the Norwegians did not admit that there is antisemitism in Norway, that they ignored or wanted to bury Hamsun's pro-Nazi stand or that they hampered the IHRA's work in fighting antisemitism in any way. Not only is none of this true, but it was the Norwegian chairman that, before this controversy exploded, insisted on including the fight against antisemitism as a central component in the IHRA's immediate future program - the proposal was accepted by acclamation.

The IHRA and the Holy See

In 2009, the IHRA suggested that the Vatican enter into a "special arrangement" with the IHRA. The Holy See's Under Secretary of State, Monsignor Pietro Parolin, answered favorably, suggesting that the Vatican become an IHRA observer country. Negotiations began, but several months later, the proposal was dismissed. On 21 December 2010, The Guardian newspaper published a news article based on US diplomatic cables released by WikiLeaks about the failure of negotiations. The article reported that the Holy See had withdrawn from a written agreement to join the IHRA (then ITF). In the leaked cables, it was stated that "the highly-regarded Parolin" had been promoted and replaced by Msgr. Ettore Balestrero.

"Surprising the ITF, Balestrero also invited a representative from the Vatican Archives, Msgr. Chappin, and the Holy See's chief negotiator for the long-delayed Vatican-Israel Fundamental Agreement, Father David Jaeger."

Balestrero, Chappin, and Jaeger who met with the IHRA representatives "evinced considerable discomfort with the idea of ITF (IHRA) observer status". The IHRA representatives—Austrian Ambassador Ferdinand Trauttsmandorff, US Professor Steven Katz of the Elie Wiesel Center at Boston University, and Dina Porat, the academic advisor to the ITF—"expressed considerable disappointment about the unexpected set-back," the cable reported. The cable was critical of the Vatican's new foreign relations team who had been changed since the original agreement to join the IHRA had been made. Julieta Valls Noyes, second in command at the American Embassy to the Holy See, reported in October 2009 that the plans "had fallen apart completely ... due to Vatican back-pedaling". 

According to Noyes, this could indicate that the Vatican "may ... be pulling back due to concerns about ITF pressure to declassify records from the WWII-era pontificate of Pope Pius XII". With the exception of two statements made about the commencement of the atrocities in Poland, Pope Pius XII has long been a controversial figure for his failure to publicly denounce the Holocaust.

From 16–17 February 2017 the IHRA, in cooperation with the Holy See, held a conference entitled Refugee Policies from 1933 until Today: Challenges and Responsibilities for public policy-makers from Europe, North America and the Middle East, media representatives and representatives of NGOs and civil society organizations at the Palazzo della Cancelleria in Rome. Speakers from the Holy See included Archbishop Paul Richard Gallagher, Secretary for Relations with States within the Holy See's Secretariat of State, H.E Mgr. Silvano Maria Tomasi, Secretary Delegate of the Dicastery for Promoting Integral Human Development, and Dr. Johan Ickx, head of the Historical Archive, Section for Relations with States of the Secretariat of State.

On 2 March 2020, the Holy See officially opened the Vatican Apostolic Archive covering material from Pius XII's tenure (1939-1958). Commending the change of Vatican policy, the IHRA Chair, Ambassador Georges Santer, said: "Archival access is a key aspect of Holocaust remembrance, and contributes directly to safeguarding the historical record. We all share a responsibility to throw light on the still obscured shadows of the Holocaust and the Second World War, and we very much appreciate the constructive talks we had in the past with Cardinal State Secretary, Pietro Parolin, and Secretary for Relations with States, Archbishop Paul Richard Gallagher.

References

Bibliography

External links
Official Website

Further reading
"Palestinian Rights and the IHRA Definition of Antisemitism", The Guardian, Nov. 29, 2020

Holocaust commemoration
Holocaust charities and reparations
1998 establishments in Germany
Organisations based in Berlin